Odites thesmia is a moth in the family Depressariidae. It was described by Edward Meyrick in 1917. It is found in Madagascar.

The wingspan is about 17 mm. The forewings are grey whitish irrorated with grey. The stigmata are black, the plical obliquely beyond the first discal. There is an angulated series of small blackish dots from beneath two-thirds of the costa to above the tornus and an almost marginal series of blackish dots along the termen. The hindwings are whitish.

References

Moths described in 1917
Odites
Taxa named by Edward Meyrick